Kishore Sharma (born 20 December 1963) is an Indian cricketer. He played in 32 first-class and 9 List A matches from 1984/85 to 1992/93.

See also
 List of Uttar Pradesh cricketers

References

External links
 

1963 births
Living people
Indian cricketers
Railways cricketers
Uttar Pradesh cricketers
Sportspeople from Meerut